Zeitglockenturm can refer to
 the Zytglogge tower in Bern, Switzerland
 the Zeitglockenturm in Solothurn, Switzerland